Laurent Lefèvre (born 2 July 1976 in Maubeuge, Nord) is a French former professional road bicycle racer, last for UCI Professional Continental team . He is one of only three Festina team riders who was named as being clean in the Festina doping affair in the 1998 Tour de France. He is the brother of racing cyclist David Lefèvre and the cousin of racing cyclists Olivier Bonnaire and Marion Rousse.

Major results

  Combative rider for Stage 8, 2008 Tour de France
 Critérium du Dauphiné Libéré - 1 stage (2003)
 Bayern-Rundfahrt - 1 stage (2003)
 A Travers le Morbihan (2002)
 GP de Villers Cotterêts (2002)
 Prueba Villafranca de Ordizia (1997)
 Vuelta Ciclista de Chile - 1 stage (1997)
  World U19 Road Race Championship - 2nd (1994)
  World U19 Time Trial Championship - 3rd (1994)

References

External links 

Profile at Bouygues Télécom official website 

1976 births
Living people
People from Maubeuge
French male cyclists
Sportspeople from Nord (French department)
Cyclists from Hauts-de-France